Borislav Borisov may refer to:

 Borislav Borisov (canoeist) (born 1954), Bulgarian sprint canoer
 Borislav Borisov (footballer) (born 1990), Bulgarian footballer
 Borislav Borisov (gymnast) (born 1994), Bulgarian acrobatic gymnast